Ann Louise Peters (née Andersen; born 3 February 1975) is a former Danish darts player.

Biography
Peters learnt to play darts at the Gåsen club in Assens.

She made her debut at the 1990 WDF Europe Youth Cup, where she won the singles three years in a row (1990, 1991, 1992); as well as the pairs in 1991 and 1992, and the team events in 1991 and 1992.

She later won the Norway Open in 1993, beating Deta Hedman, and again in 1996 against Sandra Pollet. Her last major win before she stopped, was the 1999 Swedish Open where she beat Satu Ikonen from Finland. Unfortunately, she dropped the glass sculpture trophy on the floor.

She has won the Danish Championships five times, in 1993, 1996, 2006, 2013 and 2014.

Peters has been picked 23 times for the Danish national team, which is a record for the ladies (20 as senior and 3 times as a youth player).

Peters made her comeback in 2013, and qualified for the 2014 BDO World Darts Championship. She beat Rachel Brooks 2–0 in the first round, and Julie Gore by the same scoreline in the quarter finals before losing 2–0 to Deta Hedman in the semi finals.

In October 2014 it was announced that she would receive the last wildcard for the Zuiderduin Masters

She currently lives in Esbjerg.

World Professional Darts Championship

BDO

 2014: Semi Finals (lost to Deta Hedman 2–0)
 2016: Semi Finals (lost to Deta Hedman 2–0)

References

External links
Ann Louise Peters on Dartsdatabase

Living people
Danish darts players
1975 births
Female darts players
British Darts Organisation players
People from Esbjerg
Sportspeople from the Region of Southern Denmark